Richard Kelly was an American football coach.  He served as the co-head football coach at Villanova College—now known as Villanova University—1902 with Timothy O'Rourke, compiling a record of 4–3.  Together they compiled a record of 4–3 in one season.

Head coaching record

References

Year of birth uncertain
Year of death uncertain
Villanova Wildcats football coaches